The 1909 Marquette Blue and Gold football team was an American football team that represented Marquette University as an independent during the 1909 college football season. Under head coach William Juneau, Marquette compiled a 2–2–1 record and outscored its opponents, 38 to 16.  Marquette's most notable contest occurred on November 25 against undefeated Notre Dame, who was hailed as undisputed champion of the west after their defeat of Michigan three weeks prior.

Schedule

References

Marquette
Marquette Golden Avalanche football seasons
Marquette Blue and Gold football